The 2020 FIL World Luge Championships were held from 14 to 16 February 2020 in Sochi, Russia.

Schedule
Seven events were held.

All times are local (UTC+3).

Medal summary

Medal table

Medalists

References

External links

 
2020
World Championships
2020 in Russian sport
Luge competitions in Russia
Sports competitions in Sochi
February 2020 sports events in Russia